German rapper Cro has released four studio albums, four mixtapes and 27 singles.

Albums

Studio albums

Live albums

Mixtapes

Singles

As lead artist

As featured artist

Other charted songs

Music videos

References 

Discographies of German artists